Lac Lamothe Water Aerodrome  is located on Lac La Mothe  north of Chute-des-Georges, Quebec, Canada. It is open from the end of May until the end of September.

References

Registered aerodromes in Saguenay–Lac-Saint-Jean
Seaplane bases in Quebec